John Storm (February 3, 1760 – December 13, 1835) was a revolutionary war soldier who notably served as a dragoon under Colonel William Washington in the American Revolutionary War. Dragoons commanded huge power upon the battlefield at the time because of their ability to incite fear in opposing infantrymen.  "The shock of a cavalry charge often proved decisive in gaining a victory," is a description offered by the United States National Park Service.

John Storm was born in Latimore Township, Pennsylvania, and died in Greene County, Indiana.  He served under Captains Ballard Smith and Thomas Boyer in the 1st Virginia Regiment, beginning in 1780.  Later in 1781, John Storm served under Captain Robert Morrows in Colonel William Washington's regiment of Continental dragoons.

Notes

External links 
 John Storm's Grave

1760 births
1835 deaths
Continental Army soldiers